Urea, also known as carbamide, is an organic compound with chemical formula . This amide has two amino groups (–) joined by a carbonyl functional group (–C(=O)–). It is thus the simplest amide of carbamic acid.

Urea serves an important role in the metabolism of nitrogen-containing compounds by animals and is the main nitrogen-containing substance in the urine of mammals. Urea is New Latin, from French , from Ancient Greek  (ouron, "urine"), itself from Proto-Indo-European *h₂worsom.

It is a colorless, odorless solid, highly soluble in water, and practically non-toxic ( is 15 g/kg for rats). Dissolved in water, it is neither acidic nor alkaline. The body uses it in many processes, most notably nitrogen excretion. The liver forms it by combining two ammonia molecules with a carbon dioxide molecule in the urea cycle. Urea is widely used in fertilizers as a source of nitrogen (N) and is an important raw material for the chemical industry.

In 1828 Friedrich Wöhler discovered that urea can be produced from inorganic starting materials, which was an important conceptual milestone in chemistry. This showed for the first time that a substance previously known only as a byproduct of life could be synthesized in the laboratory without biological starting materials, thereby contradicting the widely held doctrine of vitalism, which stated that only living organisms could produce the chemicals of life.

Properties

Molecular and crystal structure
The urea molecule is planar. In solid urea, the oxygen center is engaged in two N–H–O hydrogen bonds. The resulting dense and energetically favourable hydrogen-bond network is probably established at the cost of efficient molecular packing: The structure is quite open, the ribbons forming tunnels with square cross-section. The carbon in urea is described as sp2 hybridized, the C-N bonds have significant double bond character, and the carbonyl oxygen is basic compared to, say, formaldehyde. Urea's high aqueous solubility reflects its ability to engage in extensive hydrogen bonding with water.

By virtue of its tendency to form porous frameworks, urea has the ability to trap many organic compounds. In these so-called clathrates, the organic "guest" molecules are held in channels formed by interpenetrating helices composed of hydrogen-bonded urea molecules.

As the helices are interconnected, all helices in a crystal must have the same molecular handedness. This is determined when the crystal is nucleated and can thus be forced by seeding. The resulting crystals have been used to separate racemic mixtures.

Reactions
Urea is basic. As such it is protonated readily. It is also a Lewis base forming complexes of the type .

Molten urea decomposes into ammonia gas and isocyanic acid:

Via isocyanic acid, heating urea converts to a range of condensation products including biuret , triuret , guanidine , and melamine:

Urea reacts with malonic esters to make barbituric acids.

Stability
In the presence of heat, urea breaks down to form isocyanate. In aqueous solution, urea slowly equilibrates with ammonium cyanate. This hydrolysis cogenerates isocyanic acid, which can carbamylate proteins, in particular the N-terminal amino group and the side chain amino of lysine, and to a lesser extent the side chains of arginine and cysteine. Each carbamylation event adds 43 daltons to the mass of the protein, which can be observed in protein mass spectrometery. For this reason, pure urea solutions should be freshly prepared and used, as aged solutions may develop a significant concentration of cyanate (20 mM in 8 M urea). Dissolving urea in ultrapure water followed by removing ions (i.e. cyanate) with a mixed-bed ion-exchange resin and storing that solution at 4 °C is a recommended preparation procedure. However, cyanate will build back up to significant levels within a few days. Alternatively, adding 25–50 mM ammonium chloride to a concentrated urea solution decreases formation of cyanate because of the common ion effect.

Related compounds

Ureas describes a class of chemical compounds that share the same functional group, a carbonyl group attached to two organic amine residues: , where  groups are hydrogen (–H), organyl or other groups. Examples include carbamide peroxide, allantoin, and hydantoin. Ureas are closely related to biurets and related in structure to amides, carbamates, carbodiimides, and thiocarbamides.

Uses

Agriculture

More than 90% of world industrial production of urea is destined for use as a nitrogen-release fertilizer. Urea has the highest nitrogen content of all solid nitrogenous fertilizers in common use. Therefore, it has a low transportation cost per unit of nitrogen nutrient. The most common impurity of synthetic urea is biuret, which impairs plant growth. Urea breaks down in the soil to give ammonium ions. The ammonium is taken up by the plant through its roots. In some soils, the ammonium is oxidized by bacteria to give nitrate, which is also a nitrogen-rich plant nutrient. The loss of nitrogenous compounds to the atmosphere and runoff is wasteful and environmentally damaging so urea is sometimes modified to enhance the efficiency of its agricultural use. Techniques to make controlled-release fertilizers that slow the release of nitrogen include the encapsulation of urea in an inert sealant, and conversion of urea into derivatives such as urea-formaldehyde compounds, which degrade into ammonia at a pace matching plants' nutritional requirements.

Resins
Urea is a raw material for the manufacture of urea-formaldehyde resins, used mainly in wood-based panels such as particleboard, fiberboard and plywood.

Explosives 
Urea can be used to make urea nitrate, a high explosive that is used industrially and as part of some improvised explosive devices.

Automobile systems
Urea is used in Selective Non-Catalytic Reduction (SNCR) and Selective Catalytic Reduction (SCR) reactions to reduce the  pollutants in exhaust gases from combustion from diesel, dual fuel, and lean-burn natural gas engines. The BlueTec system, for example, injects a water-based urea solution into the exhaust system. Ammonia first produced by the hydrolysis of urea reacts with nitrogen oxides and is converted into nitrogen gas and water within the catalytic converter. The conversion of noxious  to innocuous  is described by the following simplified global equation:

When urea is used, a pre-reaction (hydrolysis) occurs to first convert it to ammonia:

Being a solid highly soluble in water (545 g/L at 25 °C), urea is much easier and safer to handle and store than the more irritant, caustic and hazardous ammonia, so it is the reactant of choice. Trucks and cars using these catalytic converters need to carry a supply of diesel exhaust fluid, also sold as AdBlue, a solution of urea in water.

Laboratory uses
Urea in concentrations up to 10 M is a powerful protein denaturant as it disrupts the noncovalent bonds in the proteins. This property can be exploited to increase the solubility of some proteins.
A mixture of urea and choline chloride is used as a deep eutectic solvent (DES), a substance similar to ionic liquid. When used in a deep eutectic solvent, urea gradually denatures the proteins that are solubilized.

Urea can in principle serve as a hydrogen source for subsequent power generation in fuel cells. Urea present in urine/wastewater can be used directly (though bacteria normally quickly degrade urea). Producing hydrogen by electrolysis of urea solution occurs at a lower voltage and thus consumes less energy than the electrolysis of water.

Urea in concentrations up to 8 M can be used to make fixed brain tissue transparent to visible light while still preserving fluorescent signals from labeled cells. This allows for much deeper imaging of neuronal processes than previously obtainable using conventional one photon or two photon confocal microscopes.

Medical use
Urea-containing creams are used as topical dermatological products to promote rehydration of the skin. Urea 40% is indicated for psoriasis, xerosis, onychomycosis, ichthyosis, eczema, keratosis, keratoderma, corns, and calluses. If covered by an occlusive dressing, 40% urea preparations may also be used for nonsurgical debridement of nails. Urea 40% "dissolves the intercellular matrix" of the nail plate. Only diseased or dystrophic nails are removed, as there is no effect on healthy portions of the nail. This drug (as carbamide peroxide) is also used as an earwax removal aid.

Urea has also been studied as a diuretic. It was first used by Dr. W. Friedrich in 1892. In a 2010 study of ICU patients, urea was used to treat euvolemic hyponatremia and was found safe, inexpensive, and simple.

Like saline, urea has been injected into the uterus to induce abortion, although this method is no longer in widespread use.

The blood urea nitrogen (BUN) test is a measure of the amount of nitrogen in the blood that comes from urea. It is used as a marker of renal function, though it is inferior to other markers such as creatinine because blood urea levels are influenced by other factors such as diet, dehydration, and liver function.

Urea has also been studied as an excipient in Drug-coated Balloon (DCB) coating formulation to enhance local drug delivery to stenotic blood vessels. Urea, when used as an excipient in small doses (~3 μg/mm2) to coat DCB surface was found to form crystals that increase drug transfer without adverse toxic effects on vascular endothelial cells.

Urea labeled with carbon-14 or carbon-13 is used in the urea breath test, which is used to detect the presence of the bacterium Helicobacter pylori (H. pylori) in the stomach and duodenum of humans, associated with peptic ulcers. The test detects the characteristic enzyme urease, produced by H. pylori, by a reaction that produces ammonia from urea. This increases the pH (reduces the acidity) of the stomach environment around the bacteria. Similar bacteria species to H. pylori can be identified by the same test in animals such as apes, dogs, and cats (including big cats).

Miscellaneous uses
 An ingredient in diesel exhaust fluid (DEF), which is 32.5% urea and 67.5% de-ionized water. DEF is sprayed into the exhaust stream of diesel vehicles to break down dangerous  emissions into harmless nitrogen and water.
 A component of animal feed, providing a relatively cheap source of nitrogen to promote growth
 A non-corroding alternative to rock salt for road de-icing. It is often the main ingredient of pet friendly salt substitutes although it is less effective than traditional rock salt or calcium chloride.
 A main ingredient in hair removers such as Nair and Veet
 A browning agent in factory-produced pretzels
 An ingredient in some skin cream, moisturizers, hair conditioners, and shampoos
 A cloud seeding agent, along with other salts
 A flame-proofing agent, commonly used in dry chemical fire extinguisher charges such as the urea-potassium bicarbonate mixture
 An ingredient in many tooth whitening products
 An ingredient in dish soap
 Along with diammonium phosphate, as a yeast nutrient, for fermentation of sugars into ethanol
 A nutrient used by plankton in ocean nourishment experiments for geoengineering purposes
 As an additive to extend the working temperature and open time of hide glue
 As a solubility-enhancing and moisture-retaining additive to dye baths for textile dyeing or printing
 As an optical parametric oscillator in nonlinear optics

Physiology
Amino acids from ingested food that are used for the synthesis of proteins and other biological substances — or produced from catabolism of muscle protein — are oxidized by the body as an alternative source of energy, yielding urea and carbon dioxide. The oxidation pathway starts with the removal of the amino group by a transaminase; the amino group is then fed into the urea cycle. The first step in the conversion of amino acids from protein into metabolic waste in the liver is removal of the alpha-amino nitrogen, which results in ammonia. Because ammonia is toxic, it is excreted immediately by fish, converted into uric acid by birds, and converted into urea by mammals.

Ammonia is a common byproduct of the metabolism of nitrogenous compounds. Ammonia is smaller, more volatile and more mobile than urea. If allowed to accumulate, ammonia would raise the pH in cells to toxic levels. Therefore, many organisms convert ammonia to urea, even though this synthesis has a net energy cost. Being practically neutral and highly soluble in water, urea is a safe vehicle for the body to transport and excrete excess nitrogen.

Urea is synthesized in the body of many organisms as part of the urea cycle, either from the oxidation of amino acids or from ammonia. In this cycle, amino groups donated by ammonia and -aspartate are converted to urea, while -ornithine, citrulline, -argininosuccinate, and -arginine act as intermediates. Urea production occurs in the liver and is regulated by N-acetylglutamate. Urea is then dissolved into the blood (in the reference range of 2.5 to 6.7 mmol/L) and further transported and excreted by the kidney as a component of urine. In addition, a small amount of urea is excreted (along with sodium chloride and water) in sweat.

In water, the amine groups undergo slow displacement by water molecules, producing ammonia, ammonium ion, and bicarbonate ion. For this reason, old, stale urine has a stronger odor than fresh urine.

Humans
The cycling of and excretion of urea by the kidneys is a vital part of mammalian metabolism. Besides its role as carrier of waste nitrogen, urea also plays a role in the countercurrent exchange system of the nephrons, that allows for reabsorption of water and critical ions from the excreted urine. Urea is reabsorbed in the inner medullary collecting ducts of the nephrons, thus raising the osmolarity in the medullary interstitium surrounding the thin descending limb of the loop of Henle, which makes the water reabsorb.

By action of the urea transporter 2, some of this reabsorbed urea eventually flows back into the thin descending limb of the tubule, through the collecting ducts, and into the excreted urine. The body uses this mechanism, which is controlled by the antidiuretic hormone, to create hyperosmotic urine — i.e., urine with a higher concentration of dissolved substances than the blood plasma. This mechanism is important to prevent the loss of water, maintain blood pressure, and maintain a suitable concentration of sodium ions in the blood plasma.

The equivalent nitrogen content (in grams) of urea (in mmol) can be estimated by the conversion factor 0.028 g/mmol. Furthermore, 1 gram of nitrogen is roughly equivalent to 6.25 grams of protein, and 1 gram of protein is roughly equivalent to 5 grams of muscle tissue. In situations such as muscle wasting, 1 mmol of excessive urea in the urine (as measured by urine volume in litres multiplied by urea concentration in mmol/L) roughly corresponds to a muscle loss of 0.67 gram.

Other species
In aquatic organisms the most common form of nitrogen waste is ammonia, whereas land-dwelling organisms convert the toxic ammonia to either urea or uric acid. Urea is found in the urine of mammals and amphibians, as well as some fish. Birds and saurian reptiles have a different form of nitrogen metabolism that requires less water, and leads to nitrogen excretion in the form of uric acid. Tadpoles excrete ammonia, but shift to urea production during metamorphosis. Despite the generalization above, the urea pathway has been documented not only in mammals and amphibians, but in many other organisms as well, including birds, invertebrates, insects, plants, yeast, fungi, and even microorganisms.

Adverse effects
Urea can be irritating to skin, eyes, and the respiratory tract. Repeated or prolonged contact with urea in fertilizer form on the skin may cause dermatitis.

High concentrations in the blood can be damaging. Ingestion of low concentrations of urea, such as are found in typical human urine, are not dangerous with additional water ingestion within a reasonable time-frame. Many animals (e.g. camels, rodents or dogs) have a much more concentrated urine which may contain a higher urea amount than normal human urine.

Urea can cause algal blooms to produce toxins, and its presence in the runoff from fertilized land may play a role in the increase of toxic blooms.

The substance decomposes on heating above melting point, producing toxic gases, and reacts violently with strong oxidants, nitrites, inorganic chlorides, chlorites and perchlorates, causing fire and explosion.

Analysis
Urea is readily quantified by a number of different methods, such as the diacetyl monoxime colorimetric method, and the Berthelot reaction (after initial conversion of urea to ammonia via urease). These methods are amenable to high throughput instrumentation, such as automated flow injection analyzers and 96-well micro-plate spectrophotometers.

Etymology
Urea is New Latin, from French , from Ancient Greek  (ouron, "urine"), itself from Proto-Indo-European *h₂worsom.

History
Urea was first discovered in urine in 1727 by the Dutch scientist Herman Boerhaave, although this discovery is often attributed to the French chemist Hilaire Rouelle as well as William Cruickshank.

Boerhaave used the following steps to isolate urea:
 Boiled off water, resulting in a substance similar to fresh cream
 Used filter paper to squeeze out remaining liquid
 Waited a year for solid to form under an oily liquid
 Removed the oily liquid
 Dissolved the solid in water
 Used recrystallization to tease out the urea

In 1828, the German chemist Friedrich Wöhler obtained urea artificially by treating silver cyanate with ammonium chloride.

This was the first time an organic compound was artificially synthesized from inorganic starting materials, without the involvement of living organisms. The results of this experiment implicitly discredited vitalism, the theory that the chemicals of living organisms are fundamentally different from those of inanimate matter. This insight was important for the development of organic chemistry. His discovery prompted Wöhler to write triumphantly to Jöns Jakob Berzelius:
"I must tell you that I can make urea without the use of kidneys, either man or dog. Ammonium cyanate is urea."
In fact, his second sentence was incorrect. Ammonium cyanate  and urea  are two different chemicals with the same empirical formula , which are in chemical equilibrium heavily favoring urea under standard conditions. Regardless, with his discovery, Wöhler secured a place among the pioneers of organic chemistry.

Historical preparation
Urea was first noticed by Herman Boerhaave in the early 18th century from evaporates of urine. In 1773, Hilaire Rouelle obtained crystals containing urea from human urine by evaporating it and treating it with alcohol in successive filtrations. This method was aided by Carl Wilhelm Scheele's discovery that urine treated by concentrated nitric acid precipitated crystals. Antoine François, comte de Fourcroy and Louis Nicolas Vauquelin discovered in 1799 that the nitrated crystals were identical to Rouelle's substance and invented the term "urea." Berzelius made further improvements to its purification and finally William Prout, in 1817, succeeded in obtaining and determining the chemical composition of the pure substance. In the evolved procedure, urea was precipitated as urea nitrate by adding strong nitric acid to urine. To purify the resulting crystals, they were dissolved in boiling water with charcoal and filtered. After cooling, pure crystals of urea nitrate form. To reconstitute the urea from the nitrate, the crystals are dissolved in warm water, and barium carbonate added. The water is then evaporated and anhydrous alcohol added to extract the urea. This solution is drained off and evaporated, leaving pure urea.

Production
Urea is produced on an industrial scale: In 2012, worldwide production capacity was approximately 184 million tonnes.

Industrial methods
For use in industry, urea is produced from synthetic ammonia and carbon dioxide. As large quantities of carbon dioxide are produced during the ammonia manufacturing process as a byproduct of burning hydrocarbons to generate heat (predominantly natural gas, and less often petroleum derivatives or coal), urea production plants are almost always located adjacent to the site where the ammonia is manufactured.

Synthesis 

The basic process, patented in 1922, is called the Bosch–Meiser urea process after its discoverers Carl Bosch and Wilhelm Meiser. The process consists of two main equilibrium reactions, with incomplete conversion of the reactants. The first is carbamate formation: the fast exothermic reaction of liquid ammonia with gaseous carbon dioxide at high temperature and pressure to form ammonium carbamate:

(ΔH = −117 kJ/mol at 110 atm and 160 °C)
The second is urea conversion: the slower endothermic decomposition of ammonium carbamate into urea and water:
(ΔH = +15.5 kJ/mol at 160–180 °C)
The conditions that favor urea formation (high temperature) have an unfavorable effect on the carbamate formation equilibrium. The process conditions are a compromise: the ill-effect on the first reaction of the high temperature (around 190 °C) needed for the second is compensated for by conducting the process under high pressure (140–175 bar), which favors the first reaction. Although it is necessary to compress gaseous carbon dioxide to this pressure, the ammonia is available from the ammonia production plant in liquid form, which can be pumped into the system much more economically. To allow the slow urea formation reaction time to reach equilibrium, a large reaction space is needed, so the synthesis reactor in a large urea plant tends to be a massive pressure vessel.

Conventional recycle processes

Because the urea conversion is incomplete, the urea must be separated from the unconverted reactants, including the ammonium carbamate. Various commercial urea processes are characterized by the conditions under which urea forms and the way that unconverted reactants are further processed. In early "straight-through" urea plants this was done by letting down the system pressure to atmospheric to let the carbamate decompose back to ammonia and carbon dioxide. Originally, because it was not economic to recompress the ammonia and carbon dioxide for recycle, the ammonia at least would be used for the manufacture of other products such as ammonium nitrate or ammonium sulfate, and the carbon dioxide was usually wasted. Later process schemes made recycling unused ammonia and carbon dioxide practical. This was accomplished by the "total recycle process", developed in the 1940's to 1960's and now called the "conventional recycle process". It proceeds by depressurizing the reaction solution in stages (first to 18–25 bar and then to 2–5 bar) and passing it at each stage through a steam-heated carbamate decomposer, then recombining the resulting carbon dioxide and ammonia in a falling-film carbamate condenser and pumping the carbamate solution back into the urea reaction vessel.

Stripping recycle process 

The "conventional recycle process" for recovering and reusing the reactants has largely been supplanted by a stripping process, developed in the early 1960s by Stamicarbon in The Netherlands, that operates at or near the full pressure of the reaction vessel. It reduces the complexity of the multi-stage recycle scheme, and it reduces the amount of water recycled in the carbamate solution, which has an adverse effect on the equilibrium in the urea conversion reaction and thus on overall plant efficiency. Effectively all new urea plants use the a stripper, and many total recycle urea plants have converted to a stripping process.

In the conventional recycle processes, carbamate decomposition is promoted by reducing the overall pressure, which reduces the partial pressure of both ammonia and carbon dioxide, allowing these gasses to be separated from the urea product solution. The stripping process achieves a similar effect without lowering the overall pressure, by suppressing the partial pressure of just one of the reactants in order to promote carbamate decomposition. Instead of feeding carbon dioxide gas directly to the urea synthesis reactor with the ammonia, as in the conventional process, the stripping process first routes the carbon dioxide through the stripper. The stripper is a carbamate decomposer that provides a large amount of gas-liquid contact. This flushes out free ammonia, reducing its partial pressure over the liquid surface and carrying it directly to a carbamate condenser (also under full system pressure). From there, reconstituted ammonium carbamate liquor is passed to the urea production reactor. That eliminates the medium-pressure stage of the conventional recycle process.

Side reactions 

It is fortunate that the urea conversion reaction is slow. If it were not it would go into reverse in the stripper. As it is, succeeding stages of the process must be designed to minimize residence times, at least until the temperature reduces to the point where the reversion reaction is very slow.

Two reactions produce impurities. Biuret is formed when two molecules of urea combine with the loss of a molecule of ammonia.

Normally this reaction is suppressed in the synthesis reactor by maintaining an excess of ammonia, but after the stripper, it occurs until the temperature is reduced. Biuret is undesirable in fertilizer urea because it is toxic to crop plants, although to what extent depends on the nature of the crop and the method of application of the urea. (Biuret is actually welcome in urea when is used as a cattle feed supplement).

Isocyanic acid HNCO and ammonia  results from the thermal decomposition of ammonium cyanate , which is in chemical equilibrium with urea:

This reaction is at its worst when the urea solution is heated at low pressure, which happens when the solution is concentrated for prilling or granulation (see below). The reaction products mostly volatilize into the overhead vapours, and recombine when these condense to form urea again, which contaminates the process condensate.

Corrosion 

Ammonium carbamate solutions are notoriously corrosive to metallic construction materials, even more resistant forms of stainless steel – especially in the hottest parts of the plant such as the stripper. Historically corrosion has been minimized (although not eliminated) by continuous injection of a small amount of oxygen (as air) into the plant to establish and maintain a passive oxide layer on exposed stainless steel surfaces. Because the carbon dioxide feed is recovered from ammonia synthesis gas, it contains traces of hydrogen that can mingle with passivation air to form an explosive mixture if allowed to accumulate.

In the mid 1990s two duplex (ferritic-austenitic) stainless steels were introduced (DP28W, jointly developed by Toyo Engineering and Sumitomo Metals Industries and Safurex, jointly developed by Stamicarbon and Sandvik Materials Technology (Sweden).) These let manufactures drastically reduce the amount of passivation oxygen. In theory, they could operate with no oxygen.

Saipem now uses either zirconium stripper tubes, or bimetallic tubes with a titanium body (cheaper but less erosion-resistant) and a metallurgically bonded internal zirconium lining. These tubes are fabricated by ATI Wah Chang (USA) using its Omegabond technique.

Finishing 

Urea can be produced as prills, granules, pellets, crystals, and solutions.

Solid forms 

For its main use as a fertilizer urea is mostly marketed in solid form, either as prills or granules. The advantage of prills is that, in general, they can be produced more cheaply than granules and that the technique was firmly established in industrial practice long before a satisfactory urea granulation process was commercialized. However, on account of the limited size of particles that can be produced with the desired degree of sphericity and their low crushing and impact strength, the performance of prills during bulk storage, handling and use is generally (with some exceptions) considered inferior to that of granules.

High-quality compound fertilizers containing nitrogen co-granulated with other components such as phosphates have been produced routinely since the beginnings of the modern fertilizer industry, but on account of the low melting point and hygroscopic nature of urea it took courage to apply the same kind of technology to granulate urea on its own. But at the end of the 1970s three companies began to develop fluidized-bed granulation.

UAN solutions 

In admixture, the combined solubility of ammonium nitrate and urea is so much higher than that of either component alone that it is possible to obtain a stable solution (known as UAN) with a total nitrogen content (32%) approaching that of solid ammonium nitrate (33.5%), though not, of course, that of urea itself (46%). Given the ongoing safety and security concerns surrounding fertilizer-grade solid ammonium nitrate, UAN provides a considerably safer alternative without entirely sacrificing the agronomic properties that make ammonium nitrate more attractive than urea as a fertilizer in areas with short growing seasons. It is also more convenient to store and handle than a solid product and easier to apply accurately to the land by mechanical means.

Laboratory preparation
Ureas in the more general sense can be accessed in the laboratory by reaction of phosgene with primary or secondary amines:

These reactions proceed through an isocyanate intermediate. Non-symmetric ureas can be accessed by the reaction of primary or secondary amines with an isocyanate.

Urea can also be produced by heating ammonium cyanate to 60 °C.

See also 
 Wöhler urea synthesis
 Thiourea

References

External links

 

Nitrogen cycle
 
Functional groups
Excretion
Soil improvers
Fertilizers
Urea cycle
Lymph fluid
Commodity chemicals
Household chemicals
E-number additives
Organic compounds with 1 carbon atom